Gregory Wyatt Mills (born January 25, 1995) is an American professional baseball relief pitcher for the Boston Red Sox of Major League Baseball (MLB). He made his MLB debut in 2021 for the Seattle Mariners and has also played in MLB for the Kansas City Royals.

Amateur career
Mills attended Gonzaga Preparatory School in Spokane, Washington. Undrafted out of high school, he enrolled at Gonzaga University where he played college baseball for the Bulldogs.

In 2014, as a freshman at Gonzaga, Mills compiled a 3.65 earned run average (ERA) in  innings pitched, and as a sophomore in 2015, he went 1–0 with a 2.79 ERA in 19 innings. Mills broke out as a junior in 2016, going 3–2 with a 2.65 ERA and seven saves in 37 innings pitched in relief. He was selected by the Tampa Bay Rays in the 17th round of the 2016 MLB draft, but did not sign. That summer, he played in the Alaska Baseball League. During his senior year, he went 2–2 with a 1.79 ERA and 12 saves in 22 relief appearances. He was then selected by the Seattle Mariners in the third round of the 2017 MLB draft.

Professional career

Seattle Mariners
Mills signed with Seattle and made his professional debut with the Everett AquaSox before earning a promotion to the Clinton LumberKings. In  innings pitched between the two club, he went 0–2 with six saves and a 1.77 ERA, striking out 29. In 2018, he began the year with the Modesto Nuts, with whom he went 6–0 with 11 saves and a 1.91 ERA in  innings pitched and was named a California League All-Star. At the end of the season, he was promoted to the Arkansas Travelers, pitching to a 10.13 ERA in  innings. After the season, he was assigned to play for the Peoria Javelinas of the Arizona Fall League where he was 1–0 with a 1.93 ERA in eight appearances. In 2019, he returned to Arkansas, going 4–2 with eight saves and a 4.27 ERA over  relief innings, striking out 66. He did not pitch professionally during 2020, due to cancellation of the minor-league season amidst the COVID-19 pandemic.

On November 20, 2020, Mills was added to Seattle's 40-man roster. On May 1, 2021, Mills was promoted to the major leagues for the first time. He made his MLB debut that night, pitching a scoreless inning of relief against the Los Angeles Angels. For the 2021 season with the Mariners, Mills pitched  innings in which he gave up 14 earned runs, walking seven, and striking out 11. When not with Seattle, Mills pitched with the Tacoma Rainers of the Triple-A West, going 4–2 with a 3.14 ERA and 51 strikeouts over  innings.

During 2022, Mills split time between Seattle and Tacoma through June; he appeared in eight games with Seattle during which he recorded a 4.15 ERA while striking out six batters in  innings, and 16 games with Tacoma with a 1.87 ERA while striking out 17 batters in  innings.

Kansas City Royals
On June 27, 2022, Mills and minor-league starting pitcher William Fleming were traded to the Kansas City Royals in exchange for Carlos Santana. Through the end of the regular season, Mills pitched in 19 games for Kansas City, striking out 20 batters in  innings with a 4.79 ERA. He also pitched in 13 minor-league games with the Omaha Storm Chasers, posted a 2.57 ERA while striking out 23 batters in 14 innings. On December 13, Mills was designated for assignment.

Boston Red Sox
On December 16, 2022, Mills was traded to the Boston Red Sox for minor-league pitcher Jacob Wallace.

International career
In October 2019, Mills was selected for the United States national baseball team for the 2019 WBSC Premier12 tournament, held in November 2019.

References

External links

Gonzaga Bulldogs bio

1995 births
Living people
Arkansas Travelers players
Baseball players from Spokane, Washington
Everett AquaSox players
Clinton LumberKings players
Gonzaga Bulldogs baseball players
Kansas City Royals players
Major League Baseball pitchers
Modesto Nuts players
Peoria Javelinas players
Seattle Mariners players
Tacoma Rainiers players
United States national baseball team players
2019 WBSC Premier12 players